Sunnyside is an unincorporated community in Umatilla County, Oregon, United States. Sunnyside was once a station on the Walla Walla Valley Railway, which served the local fruit orchards, and the site of a Nebraska Bridge Supply and Lumber Co. planing mill from 1958 to 1963. Inland Fir Company also had a  sawmill.

References

Unincorporated communities in Umatilla County, Oregon
Unincorporated communities in Oregon